Anthony Killick (26 November 1829 – 8 December 1881) was an English cricketer. Killick's batting style is unknown. He was born at Withyham, Sussex.

Killick made a single first-class appearance for Sussex against Kent in 1866 at the Higher Common Ground, Tunbridge Wells. Kent batted first and made 80 all out, to which Sussex responded to in their first-innings by making 93 all out, during which Killick was dismissed for a duck by Edgar Willsher. Kent reached 20/5 in their second-innings, at which point the match was declared a draw. This was his only major appearance for Sussex.

He died at Uckfield, Sussex, on 8 December 1881.

References

External links
Anthony Killick at ESPNcricinfo
Anthony Killick at CricketArchive

1829 births
1881 deaths
People from Withyham
English cricketers
Sussex cricketers